Hadronema is a genus of plant bugs in the family Miridae.

Species
 Hadronema bispinosum Knight, 1928
 Hadronema breviatum Knight, 1928
 Hadronema incognitum Forero, 2008
 Hadronema mexicanum Forero, 2008
 Hadronema militaris Uhler, 1872
 Hadronema pictum Uhler, 1895
 Hadronema simplex Knight, 1928
 Hadronema sinuatum Knight, 1928

References

Further reading

 
 
 

Miridae genera
Articles created by Qbugbot
Orthotylini